The Battle of Thessalonica occurred in 995 or earlier, near the city of Thessalonica, Greece. The battle was part of the long Bulgarian–Byzantine war of the late 10th and early 11th centuries. The Bulgarians under their ruler, Tsar Samuil, succeeded in ambushing and destroying the Byzantine garrison of Thessalonica, killing its commander, Gregory Taronites, and capturing his son Ashot.

Origins of the conflict
After the great victory in the Battle of Trajan's Gates, and the subsequent civil war in the Byzantine Empire, Samuil was free to attack the Byzantine strongholds all over the Balkan peninsula. After having secured his rule over most of the northern Balkans, he led a campaign against Thessalonica, Byzantium's second largest city, held by the doux Gregory Taronites.

The exact date of this campaign, and the subsequent battle, is unclear. An Armenian source puts it as early as 991, while the account of John Skylitzes, on which the dating by traditional accounts relies, implies it happened in 996. However, as John Chaldos is attested as doux in Thessalonica in 995/6 in succession to Taronites, the campaign must have happened at the latest in 995, if not some time before.

The battle
Samuil sent a small detachment towards the city, while the main body of his army remained behind to carefully prepare an ambush for the Byzantine army. As the Bulgarian raiding party approached Thessalonica, Gregory Taronites sent out his son, Ashot, with the vanguard to make contact with them and reconnoitre the Bulgarian dispositions. Ashot engaged the Bulgarian raiding party and drove them back, but was drawn into the ambush and encircled with his men. His father, following up with the main Byzantine force, rushed to his rescue, but was killed trying to reach him.

Aftermath
Ashot Taronites was taken captive and taken to Bulgaria, where shortly after he was wed to Samuil's daughter Miroslava. He was named governor of Dyrrhachium, from where he soon escaped on board Byzantine ships to Constantinople, where he arranged the surrender of the city to the Byzantines.

In Thessalonica, Taronites was succeeded by John Chaldos, who likewise fell victim to a Bulgarian ambush and was captured in 996. After that, emboldened by his successes, Samuil ventured south, into the thema of Hellas for a plundering expedition. He captured Larissa and reached Corinth, after which he learned about the approach of a Byzantine army under Nikephoros Ouranos and returned north. The two armies met at the Spercheios river, where Samuil was defeated. The long Byzantine-Bulgarian conflict, however, would go on until the final defeat of Bulgaria in 1018.

References

Sources
Йордан Андреев, Милчо Лалков, Българските ханове и царе, Велико Търново, 1996.
 
 
 

990s conflicts
10th century in Bulgaria
990s in the Byzantine Empire
Battles involving the First Bulgarian Empire
Battles of the Byzantine–Bulgarian Wars in Thessalonica
Military history of Thessaloniki
995
Ambushes in Europe